Robert Kennedy Memorial Presbyterian Church, also known as Welsh Run Presbyterian Church, is a historic Presbyterian church in Montgomery Township, Franklin County, Pennsylvania. It was built in 1871, and is a -story, frame Italianate-style building.  It is three bays wide and four bays long, and has a central bell tower and gable roof.  It features a stained glass window by the Tiffany Studio in New York, dated 1934.  The property includes the church cemetery, established in 1774.  The church is named for Rev. Robert Kennedy, who served the congregation from 1802 to 1816 and 1825 to 1843.

It was added to the National Register of Historic Places in 2009.

References

Churches on the National Register of Historic Places in Pennsylvania
Italianate architecture in Pennsylvania
Churches completed in 1871
19th-century Presbyterian church buildings in the United States
Churches in Franklin County, Pennsylvania
Presbyterian churches in Pennsylvania
National Register of Historic Places in Franklin County, Pennsylvania
Italianate church buildings in the United States